Mordellistena pulicaria is a species of beetle in the genus Mordellistena of the family Mordellidae. It was described by Champion in 1891.

References

Beetles described in 1891
pulicaria